Black Light is the sixth studio album by the London electronic duo Groove Armada. Black Light combines the more mainstream-oriented sound of its predecessor, Soundboy Rock, with the rock spirit of Lovebox, and the band makes use of 1980s synthesizers for the first time. The album is influenced by David Bowie, Fleetwood Mac, Gary Numan, New Order and Roxy Music.

The vocal collaborations on the album include Bryan Ferry, Fenech-Soler, Jess Larrabee, Nick Littlemore, Saint Saviour and Will Young.

The album received a nomination for the 53rd Grammy Awards in the category Best Electronic/Dance Album.

Track listing

North American edition

Singles

Charts

Sales

References

External links
Review of History (feat. Will Young)

Groove Armada albums
2010 albums